Pine View (also Pineview) is an unincorporated community in Perry County, Tennessee, United States. Its elevation is 407 feet (124 m). It lies along State Route 438, approximately halfway between Mousetail Landing State Park and Lobelville.

References

Unincorporated communities in Perry County, Tennessee
Unincorporated communities in Tennessee